Gondrani, also known as Shehr-e-Roghan, is an archaeological site near the town of Bela in Balochistan, Pakistan.

Alternate names
The town is also known as the Cave City of Lasbella, the Cave Dwellings of Gondrani, the House of the Spirits, and the town of Mai Goudrani.

Location

History

The exact history of the town is not known, nor who built the caves. Historians believe that the town was once a large Buddhist monastery dating back to the eighth century, when the region was part of a Buddhist kingdom. André Wink in his book Early Medieval India and the Expansion of Islam: 7th-11th Centuries states that:

According to another source, Journal of the Society for South Asian Studies, the site cannot be conclusively linked to Buddhist heritage, though it does show Buddhist characteristics:

The Geographical Journal agrees that the caves are of Buddhist origin:

Caves of Gondrani
The Caves of Gondrani are locally known as Puraney Ghar, simply translating to ‘Old Houses’.,. 

They are carved into solid conglomerate rocks at several levels, and are connected by pathways. All the caves have small rooms with hearths and wall niches for lamps, along with verandahs or front porches.

During British rule, around 1500 caves were reported, but now only 500 remain. The caves are in poor condition and are slowly eroding. No conservation efforts have been made to protect the site due to poor accessibility and lack of knowledge of the archaeological site.

Legends
Many local legends are associated with the town. One relates the story of a king and his daughter, named Badiul Jamal, during the reign of king Solomon, who was haunted by demons. Many heroes came to free her and failed, but eventually Prince Saif-ul-Muluk killed the demons and freed her. According to another legend, the demons and evil spirits inhabiting the mountain would torment and feed on the flesh of the people of Gondrani. An old holy woman named Mai Balochani or Mai Balochani sacrificed herself to kill the demons and free the town people. In another version, the pious lady exorcised the town and lived there until her death. The woman is buried nearby; her burial place is a well-known local shrine.

See also
Archaeological sites in Lasbella

References

Lasbela District
Archaeological sites in Balochistan, Pakistan